The Smith DSA-1 Miniplane ("Darn Small Aeroplane", "Darned Small Airplane", or "Damn Small Airplane") is a single-seat, single-engine sport aircraft designed in the United States in the 1950s and marketed for home building.

Design
The Miniplane is a conventional single-bay biplane with staggered wings of unequal span braced with N-struts and wires. The Miniplane design has fixed undercarriage with a steerable tailwheel and although designed with an open cockpit, many have been fitted with canopies. The fuselage and  the tail fin are of a conventional truss design constructed of welded steel tube and covered in fabric, and the wing spars and ribs are made from spruce and also fabric-covered. A variant has been built with an all-metal wing construction.

Engines used by builders are generally the 65-hp (48-kW) Continental A65, 85-hp (63-kW) Continental C85 or the Lycoming O-235 of 100 hp to 125 hp (75 kW to 93 kW).

Development
Designer Frank Smith died of a heart attack shortly after completing the prototype. His wife, Dorothy, and son, Donald continued to market the plans into the 1970s and Donald worked on a two-seat version, the Miniplane +1.

In the late 1990s Sky Classic Aircraft of Des Moines, Iowa was developing an improved version of the Miniplane designated as the Smith Sport Miniplane. This model featured more cockpit room for larger pilots, a new airfoil and re-drawn plans to aid construction.

In 2010, Sky Classic Aircraft of Des Moines, Iowa marketed plans for another updated version of the Miniplane, the Miniplane 2000.  The Miniplane 2000 incorporates several modifications to the original design, including a slightly longer and wider fuselage to accommodate larger pilots, adding bracing struts to reinforce the horizontal stabilizer, and changing the airfoil section and angles of incidence of the wings.

Operational history
In August 1959, Tom Messick flew a Miniplane on a 4,200-mile (6,700-km) round trip to attend the EAA Fly-in at Rockford, Illinois and was awarded a trophy for flying the longest distance to the event.

The prototype DSA-1 is preserved at the EAA AirVenture Museum. Originally lent to the museum by Dorothy and Donald Smith in 1973, Donald donated the aircraft in 1988 in memory of his mother.

Variants
DSA-1 Miniplane
original single-seat version by Frank Smith
Miniplane +1
two-seat version by Donald Smith
Miniplane 2000
updated version by Sky Classic Aircraft
Sport Miniplane
updated version from the late 1990s by Sky Classic Aircraft, with more cockpit room for larger pilots, a new airfoil and re-drawn plans.

Specifications (DSA-1 prototype)

See also

Notes

References

External links

 Elmer Carlson's account of the first flight of N671EC
 "Underrated biplane" by Kenny Grisham
 Bob McDaniel's N1321
 W. C. "Bill" Porter's photo album of N8NE

1950s United States sport aircraft
Homebuilt aircraft
Biplanes
Single-engined tractor aircraft
Aircraft first flown in 1956